Shaan Rahman (born 30 December 1979) is an Indian composer and singer, best known for his compositions in the Malayalam cinema. Shaan made his debut as a music director in the 2009 film Ee Pattanathil Bhootham directed by Johny Antony. He got the chance to work in the film after the wide acceptance and popularity of his 2008 music album "Coffee at MG Road" which he did along with his friend, singer, and director Vineeth Sreenivasan. 

Vineeth invited him to work in his directorial debut film Malarvaadi Arts Club (2010). Later on, Shaan has frequently collaborated with Vineeth in his films. 

He gained popularity with the films such as Thattathin Marayathu (2012), Ormayundo Ee Mukham (2014), Aadu (2015),Oru Vadakkan Selfie (2015), Adi Kapyare Kootamani (2015), Vettah (2016), Jacobinte Swargarajyam (2016), Annmariya Kalippilaanu (2016), and the song Jimikki Kammal from the film Velipadinte Pusthakam (2017) gained nationwide acceptance with so many alternative versions of it being released online.

Shaan's third film as music director was Thattathin Marayathu (2012), directed by Vineeth Sreenivasan. It's music was positively received by the public and composer M. Jayachandran went on to state that "Muthuchippi Poloru" was his favourite song of the year. In 2014, he made his Telugu debut with Saheba Subramanyam which is the remake of Thattathin Marayathu.

Early and personal life
Shaan's father works for Union Cement Company (UCC) while his mother remains a housewife. He has a younger sister Sherry and a brother Shaheer. Sherry is a doctor by profession and is married to Dr. Khalid. Shaheer is studying B.A. Visual Effects at ICAT. Shaan married Zaira on 11 October 2009. They have a son Rayan. Shaan was born and brought up in Thalassery, Kannur district. He lives with his family at Kakkanad, Kochi.

Albums
 Desi Noise Revolution (2006)
 Malayalee (2007)
 Coffee at MG Road (2008)

Television

Discography

As Composer

{| class="wikitable sortable"
|-
! Year!! Film!! Director!! Language!! Notes
|-
| 2009 || Ee Pattanathil Bhootham || Johny Antony || Malayalam || Debut movie
|-
| 2010 || Malarvaadi Arts Club || Vineeth Sreenivasan || Malayalam ||
|-
| 2011 || The Metro || Bipin Prabhakar || Malayalam ||
|-
| 2012 || Thattathin Marayathu || Vineeth Sreenivasan || Malayalam || Best Music Director SIIMA 2013
|-
| rowspan="4" | 2013 || Nam Duniya Nam Style || Preetham Gubbi || Kannada || Kannada Debut
|-
|Kutteem Kolum || Guinness Pakru || Malayalam ||
|-
|Hotel California || Aji John || Malayalam ||
|-
|Thira || Vineeth Sreenivasan || Malayalam ||
|-
| rowspan="4"| 2014 || Om Shanti Oshana || Jude Anthany Joseph || Malayalam ||
|-
| Praise The Lord || Shibu Gangadharan || Malayalam ||
|-
| Saheba Subramanyam || Sasikiran Narayana || Telugu || Debut Telugu movie.
Remake of Thattathin Marayathu
|-
| Ormayundo Ee Mukham || Anwar Sadiq || Malayalam || 
|-
| rowspan="4"| 2015 || Aadu Oru Bheegara Jeevi Aanu || Midhun Manuel Thomas || Malayalam || 
|-
| Mili || Rajesh Pillai || Malayalam || Single "Manpaatha"
|-
| Oru Vadakkan Selfie || G Prajith || Malayalam || 
|-
| Adi Kapyare Kootamani || John Varghese || Malayalam || 
|-
| rowspan="7"| 2016 || Vettah || Rajesh Pillai || Malayalam || 
|-
| Jacobinte Swargarajyam || Vineeth Sreenivasan || Malayalam || 
|-
|Meendum Oru Kadhal Kadhai ||Mithran Jawahar||Tamil||BGM onlyRemake of Thattathin Marayathu
|-
| Ann Maria Kalippilaanu || Midhun Manuel Thomas || Malayalam || 
|-
| Kochavva Paulo Ayyappa Coelho || Sidhartha Siva || Malayalam || 
|-
| Oru Muthassi Gadha || Jude Anthany Joseph || Malayalam || 
|-
| Gemini || P. K. Baaburaaj || Malayalam || 
|-
| rowspan="9"| 2017 || Take Off || Mahesh Narayanan || Malayalam || Along with Gopi Sundar
|-
| Godha || Basil Joseph || Malayalam || 
|-
|Puthan Panam || Ranjith || Malayalam || 
|-
| Meda Meeda Abbayi || G. Prajith || Telugu || Remake of Oru Vadakkan Selfie
|-
| Velipadinte Pusthakam || Lal Jose || Malayalam ||
|-
| Goodalochana || Thomas K Sebastian || Malayalam || Single "Ee Angaadi Kavalayil"
|-
| Prematho Mee Karthik || Rishi Raj, Rishi || Telugu ||
|-
| Aana Alaralodalaral || Dileep Menon || Malayalam ||
|-
| Aadu 2 || Midhun Manuel Thomas || Malayalam ||
|-
| rowspan="6"| 2018 || Rachayitha || Vidya Sagar Raju || Telugu ||
|-
| My Story || Roshni Dinaker || Malayalam ||
|-
| Chanakya Thanthram || Kannan Thamarakkulam || Malayalam ||
|-
| Aravindante Athidhikal || M. Mohanan || Malayalam ||
|-
| Johny Johny Yes Appa || G. Marthandan || Malayalam ||
|-
| Njan Prakashan || Sathyan Anthikad || Malayalam ||
|-
| rowspan="10" | 2019 || Allu Ramendran || Bilahari || Malayalam ||
|-
| 9 || Jenuse Mohamed || Malayalam || Only songs. Score composed by Sekhar Menon.
|-
| Oru Adaar Love || Omar Lulu || Malayalam ||
|-
| Janamaithri || John Manthrickal || Malayalam ||
|-
| Sathyam Paranja Viswasikkuvo || G. Prajith || Malayalam || 
|-
| Sachin || Santhosh Nair || Malayalam || 
|-
| Love Action Drama || Dhyan Sreenivasan || Malayalam || 
|-
| Pranaya Meenukalude Kadal || Kamal || Malayalam ||
|-
| Jack & Daniel || S. L. Puram Jayasurya || Malayalam ||
|-
| Helen || Mathukkutty || Malayalam ||
|-
| rowspan="4" | 2021 
|Sara's || Jude Anthany Joseph || Malayalam || Amazon Prime Movie
|-
| Minnal Murali || Basil Joseph || Malayalam || 4 songs only. Score composed by Sushin Shyam
|-
| Kunjeldho || Mathukkutty || Malayalam || 
|-
| Oru Thathvika Avalokanam|| Akhil Marar || Malayalam|| Only score. Songs by a newcomer.
|-
| rowspan="7" |2022
|Ullasam || Jeevan Jojo || Malayalam || Post Production
|-
|King Fish || Anoop Menon || Malayalam || BGM Only
|- 
| John Luther || Abijith Joseph || Malayalam ||
|-
|Prakashan Parakkatte
|Shahad Nilambur
|Malayalam ||
|-
| Roop Nagar Ke Cheetey || Vihan Suryavanshi || Marathi || Marathi Debut
|-
| Varalaru Mukkiyam ||Santhosh Rajan   || Tamil || Releasing on 9 December|-
|  || Yashwanth Kishore  || Tamil || Announced|-
|2023 ||||Abhilash Joshy || Malayalam || Filming. Songs only.Score composed by Jakes Bejoy who also composes other songs.
|}

As Playback singer
Shaan Rahmaan is also a singer and has sung songs composed by himself and for music director Deepak Dev in films like Urumi, Teja Bhai & Family'' etc.

Selected list

Awards

References

External links

Living people
Indian Muslims
Malayalam film score composers
People from Thalassery
1979 births
Film musicians from Kerala
21st-century Indian composers
Telugu film score composers